Alma rebelde (English: Rebellious Soul) is a Mexican telenovela produced by Nicandro Díaz González for Televisa in 1999. It is a remake of 1987 Mexican telenovela La indomable.

On Monday, July 19, 1999, Canal de las Estrellas started broadcasting Alma rebelde weekdays at 7:00pm, replacing Amor gitano. The last episode was broadcast on Friday, November 19, 1999, with DKDA: Sueños de juventud replacing it the following day From Monday, June 5, 2000 to Friday, October 13, 2000, Weeknights on Univisión

Lisette Morelos and Eduardo Verástegui starred as protagonists, while Karla Álvarez and Ariel López Padilla starred as antagonists. The leading actress Ana Martín starred as stellar performance.

Plot 
"Happiness and Pride are Incompatible" is the basic lesson of this story of selfishness, passion, love and deceit. It is a story about gambling with love. Ana Cristina is as beautiful as she is arrogant. She has been accustomed to having her own way with total disregard for the feelings of others.

She is about to be married to Damián when she discovers that he is unfaithful to her. Ana Cristina decides to take revenge on her fiancé and her own father, who has sided with Damián for reasons of interest. To this end, Ana Cristina ruthlessly manipulates Emiliano, a civil engineer who is newly arrived in Los Arrecifes and is immediately enamoured of her.

Ana Cristina enfolds him in her web of lies but she is about to learn that you cannot go through life crushing everyone without consequences. Through pain and tears, Ana Cristina will learn that a broken heart is not healed with remorse alone but only through the power of love and sacrifice.

Cast 
 
Lisette Morelos as Ana Cristina Rivera Hill de Hernandez
Eduardo Verástegui as Emiliano Hernandez/Mauro Expósito
Karla Álvarez as Rita Álvarez
Ariel López Padilla as Damián Montoro 
Ana Martín as Clara Hernández
Arleth Terán as Odette Fuentes Cano Rivera Hill
Aracely Arámbula as Maria Elena Hernández
Otto Sirgo as Marcelo Rivera Hill
Julio Alemán as Diego Pereira
Marisol Santacruz as Laiza Montemayor
Gustavo Rojo as Octavio Fuentes Cano
Mariagna Prats as Clemencia de Rivera Hill
Elizabeth Dupeyrón as Pamela de Villareal
Juan Pablo Gamboa as Alessandro Villareal
Evita Muñoz "Chachita" as Berenice de Avila
Frances Ondiviela as Isabel Chabela Montoro
Bibelot Mansur as Clara Hernández (young)
Adriana Lavat as Juanita #1
Claudia Ortega as Juanita #2
Raúl Padilla "Chóforo" as Narciso #1
Sergio Ramos "El Comanche" as Narciso #2
Alejandra Procuna as Iris de Villareal
Mayrín Villanueva as Paula
Raúl Magaña as Roman Palacios
Khotan Fernández as Valentino
Oscar Morelli as Evaristo
Socorro Avelar as Nana Chayo
Carmelita González as Simona
Elsa Cardenas as Natalia - Friend of Ana Cristina
Josefina Echanove as Salomé
Silvia Caos as Martina Soriano
Isabel Martínez "La Tarabilla" as Evangelina
Eduardo Antonio as El Huesos
Luis Fernando Madriz as Grillo
Ricardo Hernández as Zeus
Marieth Rodríguez as Almudena 
Marcia Coutino as Federica 
Paty Álvarez as Felicia 
Kelchie Arizmendi as Graciela
Gabriel Soto as Vladimir Montenegro
Paulo Quevedo as Ariel
Edgar Ponce as Chente
Roberto Assad Martinez as Junior
Andres Gutierrez as Mario
Maria Esther Paulino as Sandy
Dominika Paleta as Graciela
Guillermo Rivas "El Borras" as Malas Pulgas
Leonorilda Ochoa as Chonita
Andrea Lagunes as Angela "Angelita" Montoro Montemayor
Susana Lozano as Sandra de Palacios
Claudia Silva as Amada Montemayor

Awards

References

External links

1999 telenovelas
Mexican telenovelas
1999 Mexican television series debuts
1999 Mexican television series endings
Spanish-language telenovelas
Television shows set in Mexico
Televisa telenovelas